Southorn is a surname, and may refer to:

Bella Sidney Southorn or Bella Sidney Woolf OBE (1877–1960), English author, sister of author Leonard Woolf and wife of Tom Southorn
Fiona Southorn (born 1967), New Zealand paralympic cyclist
Jordon Southorn (born 1990), Canadian professional ice hockey defenceman
Thomas Southorn (1879–1957), British colonial administrator, spending the large part of his career in Ceylon (now Sri Lanka)
Willie Southorn, New Zealand rugby league player who represented his country

See also
Southorn Playground (Chinese: 修頓遊樂場, 修頓球場), a sports and recreational facility in the Wan Chai area of Hong Kong
Southorn (constituency), one of the 13 constituencies in the Wan Chai District
Southbourne (disambiguation)